The Comedy Garage is a documentary by director Logan Leistikow, released in 2011, depicting a day in the life of five rising star comedians who produce a stand up comedy show performed on a self-made stage in their garage in Burbank, California. Shot cinéma vérité style, the film highlights the unique personalities and techniques of comics Cornell Reid, Matthew Sullivan, Sean Green, Paul Danke, and Casey Feigh.

The Comedy Garage had been a staple of the Los Angeles comedy scene before filming began. Leistikow met the comedians while working at Tom Green Live. Once he was invited to a comedy garage show, he got inspired and soon began production on the documentary.

References

External links 
 
 
 LaughSpin review of The Comedy Garage

Documentary films about comedy and comedians
2011 films
2011 documentary films
American documentary films
Burbank, California
Documentary films about Los Angeles
2010s English-language films
2010s American films